Mosaic (stylized as MO5AIC) is a five-man vocal band from the United States.  An innovative vocal collaboration, Mosaic combines elements of funk, pop, rock, jazz, R&B, and even opera to create a musical experience produced entirely by the human voice.

Members
The five members of Mosaic are:
 Joshua Huslig - founder - bass, baritone
 Heath Burgett - tenor
 Corwyn Hodge - tenor
 Roopak Ahuja - baritone, tenor
 Jake Moulton - vocal percussion, bass

Biography
In 2002, bass vocalist, Josh Huslig, founded Mosaic, which consists of Joshua Huslig, Heath Burgett, Corwyn Hodge, Jake Moulton and Roopak Ahuja.  Some of the members performed in various shows at Walt Disney World and Universal Studios in Orlando, FL.  Mosaic quickly became a cruise ship headlining act and corporate entertainment favorite.

The now Las Vegas-based Mosaic moved rapidly from cruise ships and corporate conventions to venues such as opening act for comedian George Wallace at the  Flamingo Las Vegas Hotel and Casino and headlining at the Silverton Casino.  Mosaic came to Wallace’s attention in early 2006 when one of his associates, Jack McKimmey, from the Flamingo happened to catch Mosaic performing on a Royal Caribbean cruise ship during his vacation. McKimmey purchased Mosaic’s self-produced EP and brought it back with him to Las Vegas to show Wallace.  Wallace then invited Mosaic to open for him during his nightly show at the Flamingo for three weeks, but on the second night of their performance, he hired the group for the rest of the year.

Since that time, Mosaic has opened for such superstars as Prince, Stevie Wonder, and Jay Leno.  Mosaic also performed alongside Joey Fatone for TV Guide Network’s 51st Grammy Awards red carpet event, which required the band to learn 30 of the year’s nominated songs.  Soon after their Grammy red carpet performance, TV Guide Network hired Mosaic to write a custom theme song for its pre-Academy Award promotions. The song, written and performed by Mosaic, received national play throughout the 2009 Oscar season. Currently, Mosaic is a featured act at the V Theater inside Planet Hollywood Resort and Casino on the Las Vegas Strip.

Mosaic is also known throughout the Las Vegas area as staunch supporters of music and arts education in schools.   The band frequently donates their time by hosting fundraisers for the Public Education Foundation and has “adopted” West Preparatory Academy in Las Vegas, providing financial support to the school and scholarships to students with outstanding academic achievement. In addition, the group has been featured for many years at "Ribbon of Life", a fundraiser for the HIV/AIDS assistance organization, Golden Rainbow.

Awards and recognition
In December 2007, after conducting a nationwide search for musical talent, CBS News' The Early Show and Motown giants Boyz II Men named Mosaic “The Next Great A Cappella Group” in the CBS "A Cappella Quest."   In October 2008, Mosaic, with their unique instrument-free sound, was crowned the winner of MTV’s Top Pop Group, beating out eight other singing groups, all of which used accompaniment tracks.  In addition, in April 2009, Mosaic received two CARA Awards (Contemporary A Cappella Recording Awards) for their self-produced debut album, Will Sing 4 Food, including “Best Pop/Rock Album” and  “Best Pop/Rock Song” for their cover of “Home” by Marc Broussard, featuring Marc Broussard on lead vocals.

In 2011, Mosaic released "5" which was nominated for two CARA Awards, for "Best Pop/Rock Album" and "Best Pop/Rock Song."

America's Got Talent
On July 22, 2009, Mosaic appeared as a contestant in the preliminary rounds of "America's Got Talent" Season 4, receiving a standing ovation from the Los Angeles audience for their rendition of “Shining Star” by Earth, Wind & Fire.  On the July 29, 2009 episode, “Vegas Verdicts Part 1,” Mosaic secured a spot as one of the show’s top 40 contestants.  They were eliminated in the first week of the quarterfinals.

Performances/Results

Discography
Will Sing 4 Food (2008) (no longer available)
 Thank You
 Shining Star
 Creature
 Vecchia Zimarra
 Vecchia Zimarra (Remix)
 Summertime
 Lean On Me
 Seven
 You Saw My Face
 You Can't Get Far
 Manhattan Groove
 Home

Mosaic Live! (2010) (no longer available)
 Wanna Be Startin' Somethin'
 The Name Game
 More Bounce to the Ounce
 Anytime
 The Lion Sleeps Tonight
 Vecchia Zimarra
 Take 5
 Lean On Me
 Mack the Knife
 I Gotta Feelin'

5 (2011)
 I Gotta Feelin'
 Superstition
 Closer
 Firework
 Wanna Be Startin' Somethin'

RE5ET (2013)
 Speed of Sound
 Simple
 Superstar
 The One
 Just Turn Around

MO5AIC Live in Concert DVD (2013)
 Wanna Be Startin' Somethin'
 Superstition
 Just the Way You Are
 Lion Sleeps Tonight
 Vecchia Zimarra
 Take 5
 Jake Solo
 Bohemian Rhapsody
 Encore Medley

References

External links
 Official Mosaic website

Musical groups established in 2002
American pop music groups
America's Got Talent contestants
2002 establishments in the United States